Letting Go Of Lisa is a novel written by Lurlene McDaniel. It follows the life of Nathan Malone as he enters his senior year at his new high school. When a girl on a motorcycle catches his eye, Lisa, Nathan is intrigued. As the two become closer, Lisa's dark secret threatens their relationship.

2006 American novels
American young adult novels